Paul Proust de la Gironière (1797–1862) was a traveler from
Nantes who lived in the Philippines and wrote about his
experiences there. He arrived in the Philippines in 1820 and
established the Jala Jala hacienda in Morong (present-day Rizal province).
Among the activities that he undertook were hog raising and planting indigo, sugarcane, and coffee.

On June 23, 1837, Gironiere's efforts in the field of horticulture and agriculture were recognized by the Real Sociedad Economica de Amigos del Pais de Pilipinas — winning 1,000 pesos for raising 6,000 coffee plants. He ensured good relations with the clergy by building a church; and with his workers by building cockpits in the estate.

Family
His father was a noble captain ruined by the French revolution who died in Vertou, near from Nantes.

Works
Vingt Années aux Philippines (1853)
Aventures d'un gentilhomme breton aux îles Philippines (1855)
Moeurs indiennes et quelques pensées philosophiques pendant un voyage à Majaijai (1862)

References
Un Français aux Philippines : La Gironière from Archipel Vol. 14, No. 14, 1977, pp. 15–18. 
http://jacbayle.perso.neuf.fr/livres/Nouveau/Gironiere.html

External links

 
 
 Journey to Majayjay (audio)

1797 births
1862 deaths
French emigrants to the Philippines